Janko Swanepoel (born ) is a South African rugby union player for the  in the Currie Cup. His regular position is lock.

He made his debut in the same fixture, coming on as a replacement.

Honours
 Currie Cup winner 2021
 Pro14 Rainbow Cup runner-up 2021
 United Rugby Championship runner-up 2021-22

References

South African rugby union players
1999 births
Living people
Rugby union locks
Blue Bulls players
Bulls (rugby union) players